Aleš Razým (born 19 August 1986) is a Czech cross-country skier from Plzeň who has competed since 2004. He finished 44th in the individual sprint event at the 2010 Winter Olympics in Vancouver.

At the FIS Nordic World Ski Championships 2009 in Liberec, Razym finished sixth in the individual sprint and 12th in the team sprint events. He is a student and lives in Chotíkov.

His best World Cup finish was fifth in the team sprint event at Germany in 2007 while his best individual finish was 11th in Switzerland in 2008.

Cross-country skiing results
All results are sourced from the International Ski Federation (FIS).

Olympic Games

World Championships

World Cup

Season standings

Team podiums
1 podium – (1 )

References

External links

1986 births
Cross-country skiers at the 2010 Winter Olympics
Cross-country skiers at the 2014 Winter Olympics
Cross-country skiers at the 2018 Winter Olympics
Czech male cross-country skiers
Tour de Ski skiers
Living people
Olympic cross-country skiers of the Czech Republic
Universiade medalists in cross-country skiing
Sportspeople from Plzeň
Universiade silver medalists for the Czech Republic
Cross-country skiers at the 2007 Winter Universiade